Dzanc Books is an American independent press book publisher.  It is a non-profit 501(c)(3) private foundation. Michelle Dotter is publisher and editor-in-chief.

Background
Dzanc Books was founded in 2006 by Steven Gillis, a lawyer turned novelist, and Dan Wickett, a prolific on-line book reviewer.  They operated from their homes, near Detroit, Michigan.

Mission
Dzanc pursues literary fiction and eBooks.  They published their own list of independent 20 writers to watch in response to The New Yorker'''s list of "20 Under 40", which they felt was too establishment-oriented.

Former staff
Former staff includes author Matt Bell as senior editor.

Authors
Published authors include Roy Kesey, Yannick Murphy, Terese Svoboda, Allison Amend, Jeff Parker, Peter Selgin, Laura van den Berg, Anne Valente, Robert Coover, Lance Olsen, Joseph McElroy, Robert Lopez, Evan Lavender-Smith, Jen Michalski, Dawn Raffel, J. Robert Lennon, Adam Klein, Okey Ndibe, Mary Biddinger, David Galef, Aimee Parkison, Kyle Minor, Kelly Cherry.

Name
The name "Dzanc" was formed from the initials of the names of the founders' five children.  It is pronounced as two syllables, "duh-ZAANCK" or "da-zaynk".

Publication cancellation
Dzanc cancelled publication of Hesh Kestin's 2019 novel The Siege of Tel Aviv following criticism on social media that termed the book "Islamophobic." Publisher Steve Gillis explained that "It was never our intent to publish a novel that shows Muslims in a bad light... Our mistake was not gauging the climate and seeing how the book would be perceived in 2019."

Imprints
As a non-profit, Dzanc cannot "own" another company, so these are not "imprints" in the usual publishing business sense.

 Other Voices, Inc. (OV Books and Other Voices, a literary journal)
 Keyhole Press
 Starcherone Books
 Istros Books
 DISQUIET
 Monkeybicycle, a literary journal
 The Collagist'', a literary journal
 Hawthorne Books

Accolades
Dzanc Books has been called "the future of publishing" and "one of the great contemporary forces in independent publishing".

References

Further reading

External links
 Wickett's book review blog

Publishing companies established in 2006
Ebook suppliers
Small press publishing companies
Literary publishing companies
Book publishing companies based in Michigan